You Can't Buy a Gun When You're Crying is the first album recorded by Holly Golightly and the Brokeoffs, a project involving Golightly's established United States band member Lawyer Dave.

Track listing
All tracks composed by Dave Drake and Holly Golightly; except where noted.
 "Devil Do" - 3:31
 "Just Around the Bend" - 3:01
 "Everything You Touch" - 2:27
 "Medicine Water" - 3:31
 "You Can't Buy a Gun" - 2:22
 "Crow Jane" (Traditional; arranged by Dave Drake and Holly Golightly) - 2:34
 "So Long" - 3:09
 "Time to Go" - 2:11
 "Black Heart" - 3:03
 "Clean in Two" - 2:12
 "Jesus Don't Love Me"
 "I Let My Daddy Do That" (Clarence Williams, W.R. Calaway) - 2:37
 "Whoopie Ti Yi Yo" (Traditional; arranged by Dave Drake and Holly Golightly) - 3:30
 "Devil Don't" - 2:34

References 

Holly Golightly (singer) albums
2007 albums
Damaged Goods (record label) albums